NGC 2859 is a barred lenticular galaxy located some 83 million light years away in the constellation Leo Minor. The morphological classification is (R)SB(r)0+, where the S0+ notation indicates a well-defined physical structure that is lacking in visible spiral arms. It has a strong bar (B) of the "ansae" type, which means it grows brighter or wider toward the tips. A faint, secondary bar is positioned at nearly a right angle to the main bar. These features are surrounded by a weak inner ring (r) that appears diffuse. The outer region of the galaxy hosts a prominent, detached ring (R) that includes a series of blue-hued knots along the eastern side.

The central supermassive black hole is an estimated 105 million times the mass of the Sun. The nucleus is tentatively classified as a transition type T2:, with no indication of activity.

References

External links

Lenticular galaxies
Barred lenticular galaxies
Ring galaxies
Leo Minor
2859
05001
26649